Mahmut Pasha of Begolli or Mahmut Pasha (Turkish: Mahmut Mahmutbeyoglu or Mahmud Beyoğlu) was an Ottoman Albanian military commander of the Begolli family and Pasha of Peja, Sanjakbey of Dukagjin and later Beylerbey of Rumelia The Albanians participated in the siege of Vienna in 1683 as the personal bodyguard of Grand Vizier Kara Mustafa. Mahmut Pasha is a heroic figure in Albanian folklore and oral tradition.

Assassination of Jegen Pasha and Great Turkish War
Begolli is reported to have assassinated Jegen Pasha of Romania who used the weakness of the Ottoman Empire to kill and loot people in the Balkan region. In 1689, Count Giovanni Norberto Piccolomini (1650–1689) was notified that Begolli had withdrawn from Skopje with 8000 soldiers and the Imperial Forces pursued the Pasha in the Luma region. In 1692, a Franciscan source stated that Begolli was employing large numbers of Catholics from the Albanian highlands and plains and that the Grand Vizier was horrified to know that some of the soldiers were roasting pigs.

Tribal fights
In 1735–36, Begolli fought the tribes of Hoti, Kuci, and the Kelmendi. In 1737–40, Begolli fought the Berisha tribe led by Mema of Doda which resulted in the tribe being burnt to the ground. Begolli had a brother named Mustafa Pasha whose son Asllan Pasha built the bazaar of Ioannina.

Military campaigns
In the following years, the Albanian forces came several times to the Ottoman troops on the Bosnian-Croatian border to help, with the most important personality of the Albanians, who had participated in the Ottoman campaign on the Hungarian front, the Sanxhakbeg of Dukagjin and later Beylerbeg of Rumelia, Mahmut Beyoğlu, was. His role and that of the Albanian troops have not only mentioned the Ottoman chroniclers, but also many Western sources. between 1688 and 1691. Begolli fought Austrian forces in 1689 during the Great Turkish War (1683–1699).

Legacy
Begolli is mentioned as a heroic figure in Albanian folklore and oral tradition, and is compared to a lion.

References 

Pashas
Great Turkish War
Governors of the Ottoman Empire
Albanian military personnel
16th-century Ottoman military personnel